Lill-Stina på reportage i Storskogen ("Lill-Stina Reporting from the Big Forest") was the Sveriges Television's Christmas calendar and Sveriges Radio's Christmas Calendar in 1964. The radio version was called En gård nära Tomteskogen i Vilhelmina ("A Farm Close to the Santa Claus Forest in Vilhelmina").

Plot 
The TV version consists of a children's Aktuellt-like news studio from the forest, where reporter Lill-Stina ("Little Stina") delivers news reports. The radio version is set at Forsberga farm in southern Swedish Lapland, following Christmas preparations.

References

External links 
 

1964 radio programme debuts
1964 Swedish television series debuts
1964 Swedish television series endings
Fictional reporters
Sveriges Radio's Christmas Calendar
Sveriges Television's Christmas calendar
Television shows set in Sweden